Nasir Aslam Wani (born 31 August 1964) is an Indian politician from the union territory of Jammu and Kashmir and belongs to the  National Conference party.

He has served the State as the Minister of State for Tourism & Culture, Housing & Urban Development, PHE, Revenue & Relief and later taking on responsibility for the Minister of State Home department as an additional portfolio.

Wani is presently the Provincial President of National Conference for Kashmir. 
He is the grandson of politician, late Ghulam Nabi Wani Sogami.
He contested elections in 2008 from Amirakadal Constituency.

Political career
Nasir Aslam Wani was involved with various NGOs for social work. He joined the Youth National Conference in 1998 and was nominated as Central Secretary. He worked as the Provincial Secretary of Kashmir Province and was also a member of the Central Working Committee of the Jammu and Kashmir National Conference.

Amirakadal Constituency
At Amirakadal, Nasir got 3922 votes against 3103 of his rival Parvez Ahmad of PDP.

Ministry
Wani was elected as a member of J&K Legislative Assembly in 2008 General Elections from Amirakadal Constituency; inducted in the Council of Ministers headed by Mr. Omar Abdullah as Minister of State for Housing & Urban Development, PHE, Tourism and Revenue & Relief on 11 July 2009.

Home Ministry
Wani was given an additional charge of the Home Department.

References

1964 births
Living people
Indian people of Kashmiri descent
People from Srinagar
Jammu & Kashmir National Conference politicians
Jammu and Kashmir politicians